Líbáš jako ďábel (You Kiss Like a Devil) is a 2012 Czech comedy directed by Marie Poledňáková. It is a sequel to Poledňáková's 2009 comedy You Kiss like a God and includes the lead cast from the previous film, Jiří Bartoška, Kamila Magálová, Oldřich Kaiser, and Eva Holubová.

Plot

The story revisits the lives of the main characters from the film You Kiss like a God. Successful writer Karel has finally moved out of his ex-wife's apartment and is living the life of an adventurer, though something seems to be missing. Bohunka, František's ex-wife, suffers from increasingly severe depression after her husband's departure. Both she and Karel wish to get back with their exes. František and Helena, who are still together, want peace and quiet, so they fly on a well-deserved vacation to Morocco. But even in Africa, they cannot avoid trouble. Their former partners begin to creep back into their lives. Their getaway in Morocco proves to be a test of their mutual love.

Cast and characters
 Kamila Magálová as Helena
 Jiří Bartoška as Karel
 Oldřich Kaiser as František
 Eva Holubová as Bohunka
 Nela Boudová as Kristýna
 Jiří Langmajer as Láďa
 Tereza Kostková as Monika
 Martha Issová as Bela
 Roman Vojtek as Adam
 Filip Antonio as Bastík
 Milan Šteindler as Béďa
 Petr Nárožný as the psychiatrist
 Sandra Pogodová as Miluška

Release
The film premiered on 17 May 2012 after a press release held on 9 May 2012.

References

External links

 
 Former website of Líbáš jako ďábel

2012 films
2012 comedy films
Films directed by Marie Poledňáková
Czech comedy films
2010s Czech-language films